George William Tatham (24 December 1910 – 23 February 1976) was an Australian rules footballer who played with Collingwood in the Victorian Football League (VFL).

After 23 games with Collingwood, Tatham played for Camberwell in the Victorian Football Association until being struck off the list early in the 1938 season for disciplinary reasons. Camberwell refused to grant permits for the three suspended players until the next year, at which time Tatham moved to Mordialloc.

Tatham later served in the Australian Army during World War II.

Notes

External links 

George Tatham's playing statistics from The VFA Project
George Tatham's profile at Collingwood Forever

1910 births
1976 deaths
Australian rules footballers from Victoria (Australia)
Collingwood Football Club players
Camberwell Football Club players